Perla Simons Morales (born 15 March 1963 in San Pedro Sula) is a Honduran politician. She currently serves as deputy of the National Congress of Honduras, representing the Liberal Party of Honduras for Francisco Morazán.

She is the only African-Honduran deputy in the Congress. Was first elected in 2006.

References

1963 births
Living people
People from San Pedro Sula
Deputies of the National Congress of Honduras
Liberal Party of Honduras politicians
21st-century Honduran women politicians
21st-century Honduran politicians